Keratosis linearis with ichthyosis congenita and sclerosing keratoderma syndrome (KLICK syndrome) is a rare cutaneous condition characterized by ichthyosis and keratoderma.

It is an autosomal recessive disorder associated with a deletion in the transcription gene POMP, which codes proteasome maturation protein. This prevents the correct formation of filaggrin from profilaggrin.

Sympotmatic treatment with keratolytics and retinoids is successful, but if treatment is stopped, symptoms recur.

See also 
 CEDNIK syndrome
 List of cutaneous conditions

References

External links 

Genodermatoses
Syndromes